Alfred Halm (born Alfred Hahn; 9 December 1861 – 5 February 1951) was an Austrian screenwriter and film director. He was the father of the actor Harry Halm.

Selected filmography

Screenwriter
 A Drive into the Blue (1919)
 By Order of Pompadour (1924)
 Love's Finale (1925)
 Her Husband's Wife (1926)
 The Schimeck Family (1926)
 When I Came Back (1926)
 Vienna, How it Cries and Laughs (1926)
 The Bohemian Dancer (1926)
 The White Horse Inn (1926)
 How Do I Marry the Boss? (1927)
 The Most Beautiful Woman in Paris (1928)
 Villa Falconieri (1928)
 Dolly Gets Ahead (1930)
 Cruiser Emden (1932)
 The Emperor's Waltz (1933)
 Happy (1933)

Director
 The Ring of Giuditta Foscari (1917)
 The Serenyi (1918)
 The Nun and the Harlequin (1918)
 Rose Bernd (1919)
 Pogrom (1919)
 The Peruvian (1919)
 The Gallant King (1920)
 The Golden Crown (1920)
 The Last Kolczaks (1920)
 The Marquise of Armiani (1920)
 The Oath of Peter Hergatz (1921)
 Marquise von Pompadour (1922)
 Friend Ripp (1923)
 The Woman on the Panther (1923)
 The Gypsy Girl at the Alcove (1923)
 The Man on the Comet (1925)

Bibliography
 Kreimeier, Klaus. The UFA Story: A Story of Germany's Greatest Film Company 1918-1945. University of California Press, 1999.

External links

1861 births
1951 deaths
Austrian film directors
Austrian male screenwriters
Film people from Vienna
20th-century Austrian screenwriters
20th-century Austrian male writers